Pig Latin is a language game or argot in which words in English are altered, usually by adding a fabricated suffix or by moving the onset or initial consonant or consonant cluster of a word to the end of the word and adding a vocalic syllable to create such a suffix. For example, Wikipedia would become Ikipediaway (taking the 'W' and 'ay' to create a suffix). The objective is to conceal the words from others not familiar with the rules. The reference to Latin is a deliberate misnomer; Pig Latin is simply a form of argot or jargon unrelated to Latin, and the name is used for its English connotations as a strange and foreign-sounding language. It is most often used by young children as a fun way to confuse people unfamiliar with Pig Latin.

Origins and history
Early mentions of pig Latin or hog Latin describe what we would today call dog Latin, a type of parody Latin. Examples of this predate even Shakespeare, whose 1598 play, Love's Labour's Lost, includes a reference to dog Latin:

An 1866 article describes a "hog latin" that has some similarities to current Pig Latin. The article says, "He adds as many new letters as the boys in their 'hog latin,' which is made use of to mystify eavesdroppers. A boy asking a friend to go with him says, 'Wig-ge you-ge go-ge wig-ge me-ge?' The other, replying in the negative says, 'Noge, Ige woge.' ". This is similar to Língua do Pê.

Another early mention of the name was in Putnam's Magazine in May 1869 "I had plenty of ammunition in reserve, to say nothing, Tom, of our pig Latin. 'Hoggibus, piggibus et shotam damnabile grunto,' and all that sort of thing," although the jargon is dog Latin.

The Atlantic January 1895 also included a mention of the subject: "They all spoke a queer jargon which they themselves had invented. It was something like the well-known 'pig Latin' that all sorts of children like to play with."

The modern version of Pig Latin appears in a 1919 Columbia Records album containing what sounds like the modern variation, by a singer named Arthur Fields. The song, called Pig Latin Love, is followed by the subtitle "I-Yay Ove-Lay oo-yay earie-day". The Three Stooges used it on multiple occasions, most notably Tassels in the Air, a 1938 short where Moe Howard attempts to teach Curley Howard how to use it, thereby conveying the rules to the audience. In an earlier (1934) episode, Three Little Pigskins, Larry Fine attempts to impress a woman with his skill in Pig Latin, but it turns out that she knows it, too. No explanation of the rules is given.  A few months prior in 1934, in the Our Gang short film Washee Ironee, Spanky tries to speak to an Asian boy by using Pig Latin.  Ginger Rogers sang a verse of We're in the Money in pig Latin in an elaborate Busby Berkeley production number in the film Gold Diggers of 1933, .  The film, the third highest grossing of that year, was inducted into the National Film Registry and that song included in the all time top 100 movie songs by the American Film Institute. Merle Travis ends his song When My Baby Double Talks To Me with the phrase, "What a aybybay", where the last word is Pig Latin for "baby".

A 1947 newspaper question and answer column describes the pig Latin as we understand it today. It describes moving the first letter to the end of a word and then adding "ay".

Two Pig Latin words that have entered into mainstream American English are "" or "icksnay", the Pig Latin version of "" (itself a borrowing of German nichts), which is used as a general negative; and "", Pig Latin for "", meaning "go away" or "get out of here".

Rules
For words that begin with consonant sounds, all letters before the initial vowel are placed at the end of the word sequence. Then, "ay" is added, as in the following examples:
"pig" = "igpay"
"latin" = "atinlay"
"banana" = "ananabay"  
"happy" = "appyhay"
"duck" = "uckday"
"me" = "emay"
"too" = "ootay"
"will" = "illway"
"real" = "ealray"
"simple" = "implesay"
"say" = "aysay"
"bagel" = "agelbay"
"fail" = "ailfay"
"poo" = "oopay"
"party" = "artypay"
"lonely" = "onelylay"

When words begin with consonant clusters (multiple consonants that form one sound), the whole sound is added to the end when speaking or writing.
"friends" = "iendsfray"
"smile" = "ilesmay"
"string" = "ingstray"
"stupid" = "upidstay"
"glove" = "oveglay"
"trash" = "ashtray"
"floor"= "oorflay"
"store"= "orestay"

For words that begin with vowel sounds, one just adds ”hay”, "way" or "yay" to the end (or just "ay"). Examples are:
"eat" = "eatway" or "eatay"
"omelet" = "omeletway" or "omeletay"
"are" = "areway" or "areay"
"egg" = "eggway" or "eggay"
"explain" = "explainway"
"always" = "alwaysway" or "alwaysay"
"ends" = "endsway" or "endsay"
"honest" = "honestway"
"I"= "Iway"

An alternative convention for words beginning with vowel sounds, one removes the initial vowel(s) along with the first consonant or consonant cluster. This usually only works for words with more than one syllable and offers a more unique variant of the words in keeping with the mysterious, unrecognizable sounds of the converted words. Examples are:
"every" = "eryevay"
"omelet" = "eletomay"
"another" = "otheranay"
"under" = "erunday"
"island" = "andislay"
"elegant" = "egantelay"

Sentence structure remains the same as it would in English. Pronunciation of some words may be a little difficult for beginners, but people can easily understand Pig Latin with practice.

Current usage
Pig Latin is mainly used for fun. It is also used by children or young adults to hide conversation from older people. For example, a conversation between two people in the presence of an unwanted other may consist of: "ehay isay eryvay illysay" = "he is very silly".

In other languages

In the German-speaking area, varieties of Pig Latin include , which originated around Hamburg harbour, and Mattenenglisch that was used in the Matte, the traditional working-class neighborhood of Bern. Though Mattenenglisch has fallen out of use since the mid-20th century, it is still cultivated by voluntary associations. A characteristic of the Mattenenglisch Pig Latin is the complete substitution of the first vowel by i, in addition to the usual moving of the initial consonant cluster and the adding of ee.

The Swedish equivalent of Pig Latin is Fikonspråket ("Fig language" – see Language game § List of common language games).

The Finnish Pig Latin is called Kontinkieli ("container language"). After each word you add the word kontti "container", then switch the first syllables, So every sentence is converted to twice as many pseudo-words. For example,"wikipedia" ⟶ "wikipedia kontti" ⟶ "kokipedia wintti". So converting the sentence "I love you" ("Minä rakastan sinua") would result in "konä mintti kokastan rantti konua sintti".

In Italian, the alfabeto farfallino uses a similar encoding; in Spanish, a similar language variation is called Jeringonza.

Another equivalent of Pig Latin is used throughout the Slavic-speaking parts of the Balkans. It is called "Šatra" (/sha-tra/)or "Šatrovački" (/shatro-vachki/) and was used in crime-related and street language. For instance, the Balkan slang name for marijuana (trava - meaning "grass") turns to "vutra"; the Balkan slang name for cocaine (belo - meaning "white") turns to lobe, a pistol (pištolj) turns to štoljpi, bro (brate) turns to tebra. In the past few years it has become widely used between teenage immigrants in former Yugoslavian countries.

French has the loucherbem (or louchébem, or largonji) coded language, which supposedly was originally used by butchers (boucher in French). In loucherbem, the leading consonant cluster is moved to the end of the word (as in Pig Latin) and replaced by an L, and then a suffix is added at the end of the word (-oche, -em, -oque, etc., depending on the word). Example: combien (how much) = lombienquès. Similar coded languages are verlan and langue de feu (see :fr:Javanais (argot). A few louchébem words have become usual French words: fou (crazy) = loufoque, portefeuille (wallet) = larfeuille, en douce (on the quiet) = en loucedé. Also similar is the widely used French argot verlan, in which the syllables of words are transposed. Verlan is a French slang that is quite similar to English pig Latin. It is spoken by separating a word into syllables and reversing the syllables.

Verlan was first documented as being used as far back as the 19th century. Back in the 19th century it was spoken as code by criminals in effort to conceal illicit activities within conversations around other people, even the police. Currently, Verlan has been increasingly used in areas just outside major cities mainly populated by migrant workers. This language has served as a language bridge between many of these migrant workers from multiple countries and origins and has been so widely and readily used that it has spread into advertising, film scripts, French rap and hip-hop music, media, in some French dictionaries and in some cases, words that have been Verlanned have actually replaced their original words. The new uses of Verlan and how it has become incorporated into the French culture has all happened within just a few decades.

Here is an example of some French words that have been Verlanned and their English meaning:

Notes

References

 Barlow, Jessica. 2001. "Individual differences in the production of initial consonant sequences in Pig Latin." Lingua 111:667-696.
 Cowan, Nelson. 1989. "Acquisition of Pig Latin: A Case Study." Journal of Child Language 16.2:365-386.
 Day, R. 1973. "On learning 'secret languages.'" Haskins Laboratories Status Report on Speech Research 34:141-150.
 Haycock, Arthur. "Pig Latin." American Speech 8:3.81.
 McCarthy, John. 1991. "Reduplicative Infixation in Secret Languages" [L'Infixation reduplicative dans les langages secrets]. Langages 25.101:11-29.
 Vaux, Bert and Andrew Nevins. 2003. "Underdetermination in language games: Survey and analysis of Pig Latin dialects." Linguistic Society of America Annual Meeting, Atlanta.

Language games
Classical ciphers
English-based argots
Cant languages